Lark Hotels is a hotel management and development company, which owns and develops hotels, mostly in New England. As of September 2015, they run 11 hotels, ranging in size from 9 to 36 rooms. 2017 the Lark Hotels have 18 hotels with up to 96 rooms.

Hotels and Management
CEO Rob Blood and Dawn Hagin founded the company in 2012. In March 2013, Blood announced the company had formed a partnership with the lifestyle brand company Vineyard Vines, and both companies have subsequently worked together on numerous hotels.

Hotels owned and operated by the company include the Wesley Hotel in Oak Bluffs, Massachusetts, the Captain Fairfield Inn in Maine, the Attwater in Rhode Island, and the Ale House Inn in New Hampshire.

References

Hotel chains in the United States